Maqbulabad (also Romanized as Maqbūlābād) is a village in Dastjerd Rural District, Khalajastan District, Qom County, Qom Province, Iran. At the 2006 census, its population was 21, in 5 families.

References 

Populated places in Qom Province